The Matricula Consular is the name Argentina uses for its consular identification (CID) card. The term is also used by other Spanish speaking countries, such as the Mexican CID.

According to the Argentine Consulate in Los Angeles, CID cards have a lot of benefits for Argentine citizens. Moreover, it can be used to board airplanes, gain access to banking, credits, libraries, municipal programs and funerals.

References

Consular identification cards
Foreign relations of Argentina